The fifth season of the South Korean reality television competition show K-pop Star premiered on SBS on November 22, 2015, airing Sunday evenings at 6:10 pm KST as part of the Good Sunday lineup. Yang Hyun-suk, Park Jin-young, and You Hee-yeol returned as judges. The contest began receiving applications in May, with preliminary auditions taking place in Seoul and throughout South Korea, as well as the United States, Europe, Asia, and Australia until September 2014. The season ended on April 10, 2016, with Lee Soo-jung crowned as winner and choosing to sign with Antenna Music.

Process
 Audition applications + Preliminary auditions (May – September 2015)
 Preliminary auditions were held in Seoul, Busan and Gwangju, with global auditions being held in New York, Los Angeles, Chicago, Toronto, Atlanta and Vancouver.
 Round 1: Talent Audition (Airdate: November 22 – December 6, 2015)
Contestants who passed the preliminary auditions appear in front of the three judges for the first time. Contestants can pass with at least two "passes" from the judges, or a judge can offer to use the Wild Card.
 Round 2: Ranking Audition (Airdate: December 6 – 27, 2015)
Contestants who pass the first round are put into groups with others that are most similar to their singing style. The whole group can pass, fail, or a selected few can pass. Each contestant gets to have one-on-one training with Park Jin-young, Yang Hyun-suk, or You Hee-yeol.
 Round 3: Team Mission (Airdate: December 27, 2015 – January 17, 2016)
Contestants form teams to compete against another team. The winning team moves on to the next round. At least one member of the losing team must be eliminated.
 Round 4: Casting Audition (Airdate: January 24 – 31, 2016)
Contestants perform solo or in teams assigned by the judges. Each judge has six casting cards. Each spot can be occupied by a contestant or a team of contestants. Contestants selected train with their particular judge for the battle audition. Contestants not selected in the casting round are eliminated.
 Round 5: Battle Audition (Airdate: February 7 – 21, 2016)
Contestants represent the company they were cast to in a 1 to 1 to 1 battle. First place automatically gets to be in the Top 10, while 3rd place is eliminated. Contestants who finish in 2nd place battle the other contestants who finished 2nd place. Anyone who does not get in the Top 10 teams/contestants is eliminated.
 Round 6: Stage Audition (Airdate: February 28 – April 10, 2016)

Judges
Yang Hyun-suk: YG Entertainment founder, producer, dancer
Park Jin-young: JYP Entertainment founder, producer, singer, songwriter
You Hee-yeol: Antenna Music founder, songwriter, composer, pianist

Top 10
 이수정 (Lee Soo-jung) – 23 (1993) (United States), Winner, signed under Antenna Music
 안예은 (Ahn Ye-eun) – 24 (1992) (Korea), Runner-up, signed under Pandawhale
 이시은 (Lee Si-eun) – 21 (1995) (Korea), eliminated on April 3, 2016 (4th Live), signed under HF Music Company
 마진가S (Mazinga S):, eliminated on April 3, 2016 (3rd Live)
조이스 리 (Joyce Lee) – 18 (1998) (United States), 
김예림 (Kim Ye-rim) – 22 (1994) (Korea), 
려위위 (Liu Yuyu)- 18 (1998) (China), 
데니스 김 (Denise Kim) – 15 (2001) (United States), trained under YG Entertainment, debuted in Secret Number under Vine Entertainment 
 유제이 (Jei Yu) – 16 (2000) (United States), eliminated on March 27, 2016 (3rd Live), signed under WorldStar Entertainment
 우예린 (Woo Ye-rin) – 21 (1995) (Korea), eliminated on March 27, 2016 (3rd Live), signed under PurplePine Entertainment
 정진우 (Jung Jin-woo) – 19 (1997) (Korea), eliminated on March 22, 2016 (2nd Live), signed under Planetarium Records
 박민지 (Park Min-ji) – 18 (1998) (Korea), eliminated on March 22, 2016 (2nd Live)
 소피 한 (Sophie Han) – 15 (2001) (United States), eliminated on March 6, 2016 (1st Live)
 주미연 (Joo Mi-yeon) – 25 (1991) (Korea), eliminated on March 6, 2016 (1st Live)

Round 6: Stage Auditions 
 For the Top 8 Finals, the Top 10 competed in two groups on stage with the results determined by the judges. The top three contestants from each group were chosen to proceed to the next round.
 The Top 8, who proceeded to the live stage, were determined by the three judges as well as a 100-member Audience Judging Panel. The last two contestants from each group became Elimination Candidates, with the Audience Judging Panel voting for their preferred act. The two acts with the most votes from the four Elimination Candidates proceeded to the Top 8, with the other two contestants eliminated.

 The Top 8 competes 1:1 on the live stage with the results determined by the judges. One contestant from each group is chosen to proceed to the next round.
 The contestants not chosen will go through voting by 100 citizen judges, where the two top contestants will proceed to the next round.

For the Top 4, 3 Finals, Semi-finals and Finals, the judges and viewers' scores were weighted 60:40, and were combined to eliminate the contestant with the lowest score.

Ratings
In the individual show ratings below, the highest rating is in red, with the lowest in blue. (Note: Individual show ratings do not include commercial time, which regular ratings include.)

References

External links
  

 
2015 South Korean television series debuts